Riviera is a television drama created by Neil Jordan. It premiered on Sky Atlantic on 15 June 2017. The series stars Anthony LaPaglia, Julia Stiles, Lena Olin, Adrian Lester, Iwan Rheon, Dimitri Leonidas and Roxane Duran. The first series of Riviera was released on 15 June 2017 on Sky Box Sets and NOW TV, and was Sky’s most successful original series, with an audience of 2.3 million an episode, and more than 20 million downloads and views total. The first series premiered in the U.S. on 9 February 2019 on Ovation. The second season premiered on the network beginning on May 8, 2021 as part of the "Mystery Alley" block in a deal with Sky Studios. The second series was announced on 21 November 2017. It was renewed for a third series on 24 May 2019.

Synopsis
Set in the French Riviera, the series follows American art curator Georgina Clios, whose life is upended after her billionaire husband Constantine dies in a yacht accident. Georgina becomes immersed in a world of lies, double-dealing and crime, as she seeks to uncover the truth about her husband's death.

Cast and characters

Main
 Julia Stiles as Georgina Marjorie Clios, an American art curator, and second wife of Constantine
 Anthony LaPaglia as Constantine Clios, a billionaire banker and philanthropist who dies in a yacht accident (series 1–2)
 Lena Olin as Irina Atman Clios, Constantine's first wife (series 1–2)
 Dimitri Leonidas as Christos Clios, Constantine and Irina's youngest son, who becomes the head of the Clios business empire (series 1–2)
 Roxane Duran as Adriana Clios, Constantine and Irina's daughter (series 1–2)
 Igal Naor as Jakob Negrescu, Constantine's former head of security who has links with drugs, prostitution and gambling (series 1–2)
 Poppy Delevingne as Daphne Al-Qadar, Cassandra's daughter and Nico,s twin sister, who is married to Raafi Al-Qadar (series 2–3)
 Jack Fox as Nico Eltham, Cassandra's son and Daphne's twin brother (series 2–3)

Series 1
 Adrian Lester as Robert Carver; an art dealer and friend of Georgina, who deals in forgeries and stolen artwork
 Iwan Rheon as Adam Clios; Constantine and Irina's eldest son, who rejects his family's extravagant lifestyle
 Phil Davis as Jukes; a British art fraud investigator working in the Serious Financial Crime Agency of Interpol
 Amr Waked as Karim Delormes; an inspector in the Nice police force

Series 2
 Juliet Stevenson as Lady Cassandra Eltham; head of the prestigious Eltham dynasty
 Will Arnett as Jeff Carter; Georgina's uncle
 Grégory Fitoussi as Noah Levy; an ex-soldier and pilot-for-hire, and love interest of Georgina
 Alex Lanipekun as Raafi Al-Qadar; a wealthy philanthropist and businessman, married to Daphne Eltham
 Mark Holden as Martin Sinclair; private investigator, hired by Irina

Series 3
 Rupert Graves as Gabriel Hirsh, an antiquities recovery expert and new ally of Georgina
 Clare-Hope Ashitey as Ellen Swann, Chief of Staff to Alexandra Harewood
 Synnøve Macody Lund as Alexandra Harewood, a technology billionaire who is founder and CEO of Harewood Technologies
 Gabriel Corrado as Victor Alsina-Suarez, the Mayor of Buenos Aires who is in league with Alexandra Harewood
 Franco Masini as Cesar Alsina-Suarez, the younger son of Victor who undertakes illicit activities on behalf of his father
 Eliseo Barrionuevo as Dario Alsina-Suarez, the elder son of Victor and his designated successor
 Gianluca Zonzini as Thiago, a patient of doctor Alexandrain Harewood Technologies

Episodes

Series overview

Series 1 (2017)
Note: Every episode was available in the United Kingdom by download from Sky "catch up" following the first episode satellite broadcast.

Series 2 (2019)
Note: Every episode was available in the United Kingdom by download from Sky "catch up" following the first episode satellite broadcast.

Series 3 (2020)
Note: Every episode was available in the United Kingdom by download from Sky "catch up" following the first episode satellite broadcast.

Production
Neil Jordan has disowned Riviera, due to his scripts being reworked by others. He says he has no idea who rewrote these episodes. “They were changed, to my huge surprise and considerable upset. There were various sexual scenes introduced into the story and a lot of very expository dialogue. I objected in the strongest terms possible.”

Filming for season 1 began in August 2016 in the South of France until February 2017. The Clios' lavish "Villa Carmella" estate was filmed at the Chateau Diter in the Cote d'Azur. The first episode of the series debuted at the MIPTV Media Market event in Cannes on 3 April 2017.

Filming for season 2 started on 21 May 2018 to September 2018 in the Cote d'Azur, Monza, Nice, and Monaco for a 2019 release. Joining the show are Will Arnett, Juliet Stevenson, Poppy Delevingne, Jack Fox and Grégory Fitoussi, returning cast include Julia Stiles, Lena Olin, Roxane Duran and Dimitri Leonidas.

Reception

Ratings
Sky stated that first episode of Riviera drew 1.2 million viewers live and on-demand, the largest audience for a Sky original series premiere since Fortitude in 2015. BARB announced official consolidated ratings for the episode as 709,000. Variety reported an audience of 2.3 million an episode, and more than 20 million downloads and views total.

Critical response

Series 1
The Irish Independents Darragh McManus described the series as an "exceedingly well-crafted soap" that is "beautifully filmed...with a stately pace, top-of-the-range acting talent and some interesting little philosophical musings on the nature of money." Writing for The Guardian, Euan Ferguson wrote "the presences and talents of Julia Stiles, Adrian Lester, Phil Davis and Lena Olin," and called the series "borderline unmissable".

On the other hand, The Telegraphs Michael Hogan gave the first episode three stars out of five, noting that with Academy Award-winner Neil Jordan as the series' creator and Booker Prize-winner John Banville as co-writer, "the script should have soared but was disappointingly pedestrian." The Guardians Sam Wollaston called the series "awful", concluding that "Riviera might be flashy and moneyed but it lacks personality, charm, humour, soul. It is shallow, vulgar and boring."

Series 2
Reviewing the first two episodes, Hogan of The Telegraph gave them two stars, befuddled by the show's success and then declaring "Indeed, amid all the pampered beauties and stubbly playboys, it was hard to find anybody to like, let alone root for. By the end, I was willing that rampaging boar to decimate the lot." Carol Midgley of The Times stated "Riviera is one of those shows about which one could almost write: “So bad it’s good.” But not quite because it’s mostly just bad." This reviewer gave it two stars.

Series 3
Carole Midgley of The Times gave the series two out of five stars, stating 'It is a collection of ghastly, charmless people dripping in euro-bling, living obscenely rich lives in places such as Venice and St Tropez, yet who are unhappy because they are not quite rich enough.'.

References

External links

Sky Atlantic original programming
2017 British television series debuts
2020 British television series endings
2010s British drama television series
2020s British drama television series
English-language television shows
French Riviera
Mass media portrayals of the upper class
Television shows set in France